The Sir Willie Purves Quaich is an annual rugby union award given to the "most outstanding young male Scottish player" of that season. The quaich is named for Sir Willie Purves, a notable Scottish banker who was a chairman of the HSBC bank. First awarded in 2000, Donnie Macfadyen was the initial recipient.

The Quaich
The Quaich is presented by the Friends of Scottish Rugby organisation annually. The award was originally held to be for the youngest male Scottish player likely to be capped by the full senior Scotland team. However, since these young players are now often already capped internationally, the award has morphed into a "Young Scottish Player of the Season" type of award.

The Sir Willie Purves Quaich is one of three awards presented by the Friends of Scottish Rugby organisation, the others being the Sir Tommy Macpherson Quaich (presented to the most promising young player at London Scottish that season) and the Lady Jean Macpherson Trophy (presented to the most aspiring female Scottish player).

Friends of Scottish Rugby
The Friends of Scottish Rugby organisation exists to support grass-roots rugby in Scotland. They give out various grants to clubs in Scotland; these grants are also available to London Scottish as an SRU member. Over the last 20 years, their grants to these clubs have exceeded £600,000.

List of awardees

Source:

References

Rugby union trophies and awards
Scottish sports trophies and awards
Awards established in 2000
2000 establishments in Scotland
Sportsmanship trophies and awards